is a contemporary Japanese painter who has been recognized as a part of the Tokyo-Pop movement. He specializes in Nihonga painting (literally "Japanese painting"). However, instead of the traditional scenic imagery of Nihonga, his paintings focus on abstract and recognizable elements. Oftentimes his artwork consists of dreams, altered realities and childlike fantasies. They consist of both abstract and concrete elements and are also influenced by both Eastern and Western paintings.

Early life

Hiroshi Sugito was born in Nagoya, Japan, in 1970. In 1993 he graduated from the Aichi Prefectural University of Fine Arts and Music. He is a former student of Yoshitomo Nara (born 1959). He joined Yoshitomo in 1997 in an exhibition entitled “Over the Rainbow”.

Work
Hiroshi Sugito’s work tends to focus on Japanese painting with a Western influence. A lot of his imagery has a sense of “Kawaii”—which means "cute" in Japanese—and intertwines this idea with a sense of weirdness or eerie displacement. “I start moving my brush like walking into the woods, away from everything, and I want words and meanings to lose their power and just fade away.

Solo exhibitions

Sugito has had several solo exhibitions in Japan and internationally. Some of his earlier exhibitions include:
Kind of Blue, Hakuto-sha, Nagoya, Japan
“Hanging” GeleriaVilaca, SaoPaolo/ Paco Imperial, Rio de Janeiro
Heaven and Hell, Hara Museum, Gunma Tokyo Station Gallery, Japan
Paintings and Sketches, Japan Creative Center, Singapore, 2011
Needle and Thread at Tomio Koyama Gallery Tokyo Japan, 2011
the orange tree, Kenji Taki Gallery, Nagoya, Aichi, Japan, 2012
Crazy for Painting vol.9 Masato KOBAYASHI + Hiroshi SUGITO, gallery αM, Tokyo, Japan, 2013

Group exhibitions

Sugito has also participated in several group exhibitions, including one with Yoshitomo Nara in 1997, titled Over the Rainbow. Other group exhibitions include Tomio Koyama Gallery, TOLOT/heuristic Shinonome, Tokyo, Japan and Birds, Beast and FlowersGalerie Zink, Berlin, Germany.

References

External links 
 Tomio Koyama Gallery
 Taguchi Art Collection

1970 births
Living people
Japanese contemporary artists